Zanclopalpus is a genus of moths of the family Noctuidae.

Species
Zanclopalpus rasalis (Warren, 1891)

References
Natural History Museum Lepidoptera genus database

Hypeninae